Rimellopsis is a genus of large sea snails, marine gastropod mollusks in the family Rostellariidae.

Species
Species within the genus Rimellopsis include:
 Rimellopsis powisii  (Petit de la Saussaye, 1840)

References

 Duchamps, R., 1992. Description d'une espèce nouvelle de Tibia (Gastropoda: Strombidae). Apex 7(2): 47-58
  Liverani V. (2014) The superfamily Stromboidea. Addenda and corrigenda. In: G.T. Poppe, K. Groh & C. Renker (eds), A conchological iconography. pp. 1-54, pls 131-164. Harxheim: Conchbooks

Rostellariidae